Moses ben Raphael Pardo (died 1888) was a rabbi and rabbinical emissary. He was born in Jerusalem. After serving as rabbi in Jerusalem for many years, he left the city in 1870 and traveled to North Africa on a mission on behalf of Jerusalem. On his return trip in 1871 he stopped in Alexandria and accepted an offer to serve as the rabbi of the Jewish community there, a position he held until his death. Pardo was the author of Hora'ah de-Veit Din, about the laws of divorce; Shemo Moshe, responsa; and Zedek u-Mishpat, novellae to Hoshen Mishpat.

He was a descendant of Rabbi Chaim Yosef David Azulai.

References 

Year of birth unknown
1888 deaths
19th century in Egypt
19th-century male writers
19th-century rabbis in Jerusalem
Authors of books on Jewish law
Egyptian rabbis
Hebrew-language writers
19th-century rabbis from the Ottoman Empire
Sephardi rabbis in Ottoman Palestine